Roses for the Prosecutor is a 1959 West German comedy film directed by Wolfgang Staudte and starring Martin Held, Walter Giller and Ingrid van Bergen. It was one of the few German movies of the 1950s which openly addressed the German Nazi era.

It was shot at the Göttingen Studios in Göttingen near Hanover and above all, in Kassel. The film's sets were designed by the art director Walter Haag.

Plot
In the final days of World War II, German soldier Rudi Kleinschmidt is arrested for the perceived theft of "air force chocolate" which, in reality, he bought through the black market. During his court-martial, judge Wilhelm Schramm accuses Kleinschmidt of Wehrkraftzersetzung and aiding the enemy, and sentences him to death. However, his execution is prevented by an Allied air raid and he narrowly escapes, but not before fetching the document carrying the sentence signed by Schramm as bureaucratic evidence.

Fifteen years later, Rudi has makes a meagre living as a street peddler. When he goes to visit his friend, Lissy Flemming, Kleinschmidt once again encounters Schramm, now a successful prosecutor after keeping his Nazi past a secret and portraying himself as having resisted the regime. Meanwhile, Schramm initially does not recognize Kleinschmidt, but nevertheless feels uneasy about him.

Eventually, Schramm remembers Kleinschmidt, and afraid of his past being exposed, attempts to scare Kleinschmidt out of town by having the local police harass him and even getting him temporarily arrested. Furthermore, Schramm removes mentions of  the death sentence from the files of the inquiry.

Though Kleinschmidt is initially willing to leave, he suddenly changes his mind, hoping to reopen his case and to expose Schramm's past. He then smashes a shop window to steal two boxes of the very same chocolate, which leads to his arrest.

Schramm once more serves as the prosecutor in his case, but during the trial he defends Kleinschmidt instead, raising suspicion. Eventually, he absentmindedly demands that Kleinschmidt be sentenced to death, exposing himself.

The trial is stopped and Schramm attempts to escape. Afterwards, Kleinschmidt intends to leave town, but ultimately decides to start a new life with Lissy.

Production
Staudte did not believe the film could actually be made and stored the idea for it in his desk, where it was discovered by Manfred Barthel, who forwarded it to his boss, producer Kurt Ulrich. Ulrich found a company willing to produce the film for DM 900,000, the Europa-Verleih, but Staudte estimated that it would cost DM 1.3 million to make. Europa-Verleih, which had financed a number of socially critical, poorly received films before, and lost money in the process, was unwilling to invest that much. It took a further three months to find a film company willing to invest, now the Neue Filmverleih in Munich.

Staudte had to reduce his budget to DM 1 million and change the script from a drama to a comedy in order to be able to make the film. Despite this, he still had to moderate the film to allow it to appeal to the general West German public and not offend it.

Cast 
 Martin Held as senior prosecutor Wilhelm Schramm
 Walter Giller as Rudi Kleinschmidt
 Ingrid van Bergen as Lissy Flemming
 Camilla Spira as Hildegard Schramm
 Werner Peters as Otto Kugler
 Wolfgang Wahl as Defense Counsel
 Paul Hartmann as president of the country court Diefenbach
 Wolfgang Preiss as Attorney General
 Inge Meysel as Erna, housemaid at the Schramms
 Werner Finck as Haase
 Ralf Wolter as Hessel
 Roland Kaiser as Werner Schramm
 Henry Lorenzen as Graumann, waiter at Lissy's
 Wolfgang Neuss as Paul, a truck driver

Reception
The Nazi area received very little coverage in the first decades of the post-war West German movie industry which was dominated by  Heimatfilm and light entertainment. Roses for the Prosecutor was one of the rare instances in which the German justice system under the Nazis was openly discussed in West German film. Few directors dared to touch on the subject, but Wolfgang Staudte's Roses for the Prosecutor typified post-war Germany, where former Nazis rose to high ranking political and government positions without consequences for their previous actions.

The film was criticised for making Schramm too comical a figure for such an important subject, while Giller received praise for his convincing portrait of Kleinschmidt as a victim of wartime and postwar justice.

Real life
In the movie, Schramm can be seen purchasing the far right Deutsche Soldaten-Zeitung, which subsequently used this fact for advertising in cinemas, using the slogan "Read the Deutsche Soldaten-Zeitung, like Dr. Schramm".

During filming, the case of judge  in Celle came to light, which had many similarities to the fictional Schramm. During the war, Wöhrmann had sentenced two German soldiers to death for Wehrkraftzersetzung, but the court documents were destroyed in a bombing raid. Subsequently re-tried, the two received jail sentences instead. Wöhrmann's story came to light in 1959 and he went on leave while also requesting an investigation, which cleared him of perverting the course of justice and had him re-instated.

References

Bibliography

External links 

1959 comedy films
1959 films
German comedy films
German satirical films
West German films
Films directed by Wolfgang Staudte
German World War II films
1950s German films
Films shot at Göttingen Studios
1950s German-language films